Louis Stanislaus Slevin, (November 7, 1878 – November 9, 1945) was an American photographer, known for his black-and-white images of the Monterey Peninsula. He was a pioneer in the early days of Carmel-by-the-Sea, California, the first to open a general merchandise store in 1905, the first postmaster, first express agent, and first city treasurer. His photographs of Carmel from 1903 to 1835 are recognized as historically important as an invaluable record of Carmel's historical past.

Early life

Slevin was born on November 7, 1878, in San Francisco, California. He was the son of Thomas Edwards Slevin (1836-1894) and Marie Claire Bruguierre (1854-1927). He lived with his parents and two brothers on California Street in San Francisco. He married Mabel O'Connell on December 15, 1909, in Monterey, California and had one son and one daughter.

Career

Slevin moved to Carmel ca. 1903 where he and his wife and two children lived in their home on Carmelo Street between Sixth and Ocean Avenues. That same year, they bought a lot for $325 on Ocean Avenue between Dolores and Lincoln Streets, where Slevin built a general merchandise store in March 1904. The wood-framed Western false-front style store included artists' materials, stationary, magazines, Kodak cameras, photographic supplies, and fishing tackle. From 1904 to 1915, he was Carmel's first postmaster and express agent. He had lock boxes for mail that those on horseback could "ride up, insert their key into a locked box, remove their mail and ride off." He was one of the earliest registered voters in Carmel and voted for the Republican Party.

 

Slevin was a supporter of the Carmel Arts and Crafts Club where he served as treasurer and director. The club was another place to sell his photographs in addition to his store. He photographed plays at the Forest Theater, California State Fairs, the King City bridge, festivals at Carmel Mission, abandoned mines, fauna near Paso Robles, California, and settlements at Paraiso Springs. Slevin photographed the whaling station at Moss Landing, California in 1919 and many of the shipwrecks on the Monterey Bay. He displayed his photographs at the Carmel Annual Exhibitions in 1913, 1919, and 1920. His first public exhibition in Carmel was sponsored by the Wallace Johnsons in 1905, which was reviewed in the San Francisco Chronicle, saying that he had "some particularly good photographs." He was the manager of the Carmel News Company, where he sold artist materials, fishing tackle, and photo post cards of Carmel, Big Sur, and Salinas.

Slevin was a writer and many of his writings appeared in local and Monterey publications, including his historical writings on sailing ships. In 1912, he and his wife wrote a concise account of the Mission system from the beginning with a chronological table giving dates of main events. It is titled Guide Book To The Mission of San Carlos At Carmel and Monterey California.

In 1919 and 1925 he was elected secretary-treasurer of the local Manzanita Club and served as chairman of the committee for the restoration of the Carmel Mission. He was the first official Carmel City Treasurer and served for ten years. His slogan was "Safe, Sane, and Conservative." 

He established a printing photograph business for amateur photographers. In 1930, he was elected a life member of the California Academy of Sciences for the donation of 30,000 moths collected on the Monterey Peninsula over twenty years. For over thirty years, he photographed a series of photographs of Monterey Cypress trees at Point Lobos. He was a member of the Monterey History and Art Association.

Slevin sold his business in November 1939 to Mary Louise (Pearce) Dummage, who was one Carmel's first residents, and owned the Mary Dummage Shop. The store was later changed to Spencers Stationery.  Slevin and his wife moved to San Jose, California in September 1942 and purchased a home at 750 South Eighth Street. When his health began to fail, he moved to the Casa Bella Sanitorum in Saratoga, California. At this time he gave his original glass plates photographs (between 80–150) to Roy D. Graves that are now on file at the Bancroft Library.

His wife, Mabel E. Slevin died on January 8, 1943, in San Jose. She lived in Carmel for 35 years. Funeral services were held at St. Mary's in San Jose and graveside services at the Monterey Cemetery.

In 1945, Slevin wrote a series of articles for the Carmel Pine Cone about the early days of Carmel-by-the-Sea. One was titled "Carmel-Infancy to Adolescence," that was about Santiago J. Duckworth's real estate promotions for "Carmel City" in 1888; James Franklin Devendorf and the Carmel Development Company, and other historical figures.

Death
Slevin was accidentally killed on November 9, 1945, in San Jose, at the age of 67. He was buried at the San Carlos Cemetery in Monterey, California.

Legacy
Slevin photographs, from 1903 to 1935, are an irreplaceable record of Carmel's historical past. They show the city's beginnings when the roads were unpaved and transportation was done by horses. His photo collection is housed at the Bancroft Library, University of California, Berkeley.

Gallery

See also
 Timeline of Carmel-by-the-Sea, California

References

External links

 Old Carmel In Rare Photographs by L.S. Slevin
 Slevin family papers, 1886-1954
 L.S. Slevin notebooks containing lists of his negatives, circa 1880s-1930s
 L.S. Slevin photograph collection (graphic)
 Monterey area photographs (graphic)
 Monterey County Free Libraries Local History Photograph and Document Collection

1878 births
1945 deaths
Photographers from San Francisco
Photographers from California